Robert Rene Gaudreau (born January 20, 1970) is an American former professional ice hockey player. He played in the National Hockey League from 1992 to 1996 with the San Jose Sharks and Ottawa Senators. Internationally Gaudreau played for the American national team at the senior and junior level, including the 1993 World Championship. He is the son of former Brown University ice hockey All-American and 1968 USA Olympian, Bob Gaudreau.

Playing career
Gaudreau was drafted 172nd overall by the Pittsburgh Penguins in the 1988 NHL Entry Draft and started his National Hockey League career with the San Jose Sharks in 1992. He would go on to play for the Ottawa Senators after being claimed in the January 1995 NHL waiver draft. He played a total of 231 regular season games, scoring 51 goals and 54 assists for 105 points and collecting 69 penalty minutes. Gaudreau recorded the first two hat tricks in San Jose Sharks history during the 1992–93 season. He was also the first Sharks player to be named the NHL's Rookie of the Month. He also played 14 playoff games with the San Jose Sharks during the 1994 season, scoring two goals. He left the NHL after the 1996 season and played just one more season in Switzerland's Nationalliga A for HC La Chaux-de-Fonds before retiring.

Career statistics

Regular season and playoffs

International

Awards and honors

References

External links
 

1970 births
Living people
American men's ice hockey right wingers
Bishop Hendricken High School alumni
Ice hockey players from Rhode Island
Kansas City Blades players
HC La Chaux-de-Fonds players
Ottawa Senators players
Pittsburgh Penguins draft picks
Prince Edward Island Senators players
Providence Friars men's ice hockey players
San Jose Sharks players
Sportspeople from Cranston, Rhode Island
AHCA Division I men's ice hockey All-Americans